The Auray–Quiberon line is a single-track, standard gauge French rail line that serves the Quiberon peninsula. A draft plan was presented on July 15, 1879, and the Chemins de fer de l'État (State Railways Administration) began construction. Operations commenced on July 24, 1882, and the line was transferred to the Compagnie du chemin de fer de Paris à Orléans (PO) the following year.

In 1972, passenger service—which had already been discontinued during the winter—was reduced to two daily trains during the summer.

To cope with the chronic congestion of the only road to reach the peninsula of Quiberon from the mainland, the line takes a new start in 1985, with the introduction of single fare shuttles, jointly proposed by the Brittany region and the SNCF as part of the TER Bretagne service. The name of this shuttle service is directly related to traffic jams that trains can avoid: "Corkscrew". This exploitation allows a more consistent service of the peninsula during the two months of the summer season. The rest of the year, a road bus service TIM, organized by the department of Morbihan, allows the links between the stations of Auray and Quiberon .

Railway lines in Brittany